The election for mayor of Hampton, Virginia was held on May 3, 2016. Donnie Tuck was elected as mayor, unseating incumbent mayor George E. Wallace.

Results

References

2016
2016 United States mayoral elections
2016 Virginia elections